The Chapada dos Guimarães National Park is a national park in the state of Mato Grosso, Brazil.
It is a region of rugged terrain with dramatic cliffs and waterfalls,  and contains the geographical centre of the continent.

Background

The origins of the park date to 13 September 1910 when the vice president of Mato Grosso, Colonel Pedro Celestino Corrêa da Costa, concerned about the devastation of vegetation in the headwaters of the Coxipó-açu, Manso and  Cuiabá rivers, declared that the area was one of public utility.
In 1984 a coalition of environmentalists, artists and intellectuals in the state launched a petition to protest against the act of the government in creating a tourist complex nearby.
In February 1986 a national campaign was launched by NGOs to ask president José Sarney to create the national park.
This finally took place three years later.

Location

It lies in the municipalities of Cuiabá and Chapada dos Guimarães.
The purpose is to protect significant samples of the local ecosystems and to ensure the preservation of natural and archaeological sites, while supporting appropriate use for visiting, education and research.

The park is in the Pantanal Biosphere Reserve, which also includes the Pantanal, Emas and Serra da Bodoquena national parks, and the Serra de Santa Bárbara and Nascentes do Rio Taquari, Pantanal de Rio Negro state parks.
The park is in the basin of the upper Paraguay River, protecting the headwaters of the Cuiabá River, one of the main feeders of the Mato Grosso Pantanal.
Chapada is a Brazilian word that means a region of steep cliffs, usually at the edge of a plateau. 

The geographical center of South America, formerly considered to be in the city of Cuiabá where it is marked by a white marble obelisk, is in fact located in the park near the town of Chapado dos Guimarães at the "Mirante de Geodésia", a scenic lookout point.

Environment

The rain falls mostly in spring and summer, with a little rain in autumn and winter.
Visitor attractions include mountain peaks, waterfalls and caves.

Fauna include jaguar, pampas deer, howler monkey, tapir, giant anteater, giant armadillo, maned wolf, greater rhea (known as an ema) and seriema.
Parrots, swifts and red macaws nest in the sandstone cliffs.
The park is threatened by fire in the cold, dry and windy period of the year, often caused by human activities near or in the park. Lightning does not seem to be an important cause, since it is usually followed by rain.

Notes

Sources

1989 establishments in Brazil
National parks of Brazil
Protected areas of Mato Grosso
Pantanal